Odontella is a genus of springtails in the family Odontellidae. There are about 13 described species in Odontella.

Species
These 13 species belong to the genus Odontella:

 Odontella armata (Axelson, 1903) i c g
 Odontella biloba Christiansen and Bellinger, 1980 i c g
 Odontella clavata Christiansen and Bellinger, 1980 i c g
 Odontella cornifer Mills, 1934 i c g b
 Odontella ewingi Folsom, 1916 i c g
 Odontella kapii Christiansen & Bellinger, 1992 i c g
 Odontella loricata Schaeffer, 1897 i c g
 Odontella novacaledonica Najt & Weiner, 1997 g
 Odontella rossi Christiansen and Bellinger, 1980 i c g
 Odontella shasta Christiansen and Bellinger, 1980 i c g
 Odontella stella Christiansen and Bellinger, 1980 i c g
 Odontella substriata Wray, 1952 i c g
 Odontella uka Christiansen & Bellinger, 1992 i c g

Data sources: i = ITIS, c = Catalogue of Life, g = GBIF, b = Bugguide.net

References

Further reading

 
 
 

Collembola
Springtail genera